Feigeana is a genus of lichenized fungi in the family Roccellaceae. A monotypic genus, it contains the single species Feigeana socotrana, first reported from Yemen in 1995.

The genus name of Feigeana is in honour of Guido Benno Feige (1937 - 2007), a German botanist (Lichenology and Mycology) and also Professor of Botany in Essen. He also established the Botanical Garden of the University of Duisburg-Essen.

The genus was circumscribed by Bruno A. Mies, Helge Thorsten Lumbsch and Anders Gunnar Tehler in Mycotaxon Vol.54 on page 156 in 1995.

References

Roccellaceae
Lichen genera
Monotypic Ascomycota genera
Taxa described in 1995
Taxa named by Helge Thorsten Lumbsch